David Kirtman (born February 12, 1983) is a former American football fullback. He was drafted by the Seattle Seahawks in the fifth round of the 2006 NFL Draft. He played college football at USC.

Kirtman has also been a member of the San Diego Chargers, San Francisco 49ers and New Orleans Saints.

Early years
Kirtman grew up in San Rafael, California until his family moved to Mercer Island, Washington where he graduated from Mercer Island High School. In addition to football David was a Kingco conference champion in the 110 hurdles and shot put.

College career
Kirtman played college football at the University of Southern California. David was a key part of the 2004 and 2005 National Championship USC teams where he earned the catch phrase "Another Touchdown Courtesy of Kirtman". This refers to his punishing blocking that opened up many rushing touchdowns for Lendale White and Reggie Bush. He graduated from USC with a degree in Business.

Professional career

First stint with Seahawks
He was the first fullback picked in the 2006 NFL Draft.  He was placed on the practice squad for the 2006 season. Kirtman was also Seahawks coach Mike Holmgren's next-door neighbor at the time.

In November 2007, he was signed to the Seahawks' active roster, and on November 12, David played in his first NFL game against the San Francisco 49ers on Monday night. On August 30, 2008, he was released by the Seahawks.

San Diego Chargers
On August 31, 2008, he was signed to the San Diego Chargers practice squad. He remained there the first six weeks of the regular season.

San Francisco 49ers
Kirtman was signed to the active roster of the San Francisco 49ers from the San Diego Chargers' practice squad on October 15 after the 49ers placed fullback Zak Keasey on injured reserve. He was released on November 3 when the team signed tight end Sean Ryan.

New Orleans Saints
Kirtman was signed to the practice squad of the New Orleans Saints on November 12, 2008.

Second stint with Seahawks
Kirtman re-signed with the Seattle Seahawks on May 4, 2009. On September 5, 2009, he was released during the final 53 man roster cuts.

References

External links
New Orleans Saints bio
San Diego Chargers bio
San Francisco 49ers bio
USC Trojans bio

1983 births
Living people
Players of American football from San Francisco
People from Mercer Island, Washington
American football fullbacks
USC Trojans football players
Seattle Seahawks players
San Diego Chargers players
San Francisco 49ers players
New Orleans Saints players
Sportspeople from San Rafael, California
Mercer Island High School alumni